Sumaila is a historic town and the headquarters of a Local Government Area in Kano State, Nigeria.

History
Sumaila was established as a Jobawa (Jobe- Fulani) 'Sansani' or Settlement in the 1740s. Located within the fertile plains of south eastern Kano, it provided the clan an easy migratory pathway to the grazing grounds of the savannah of eastern Hausa land. Originally called 'Garun- Sam'ila' after one of its first settlers, it attracted little attention during the time of the Sultanate.

The sharp rise of Jobe influence in eastern Kano in the late 18th century saw the construction of a stockade and a partial fort around the town in the 1750s.

Sumaila rose to prominence in the time of the Caliphate when it became the site of an epic battle that halted the advance of the Bornoan cavalry when El-Kanemi encroached into the Sokoto Caliphate.

When during the reign of Emir Abdullahi Maje-Karofi, the Ningi rebellion broke out, a Ribat was constructed around the town and a permanent fulani force was stationed there to protect the southern borders of the Emirate. During the Kano civil war or Basasa, Sumaila was a major hub for pan-Yusuf forces because of its close proximity to Takai; the capital of the Yusufawa.

Colonial period
Serving as a frontier fortress, the British pacification campaigns greatly affected Sumaila. In 1903, the entire Fulani military contingent of the fort under Dan-Sumaila Garba- Maje Gabas was lost in the Kano- Sokoto expedition.
The Last Caliph of Sokoto, Sultan Attahiru passed through the outskirts of the town attracting there from a large followership in his pilgrimage to Burmi after the fall of the Caliphate.

The fall of the Emirate witnessed a sharp decline in commerce in eastern Kano and in the 1910s, a provincial reorganization removed administration of the District's affairs to Wudil and Sumaila was relegated to sub-borough status.

In 1923 the discovery of gold reserves by a British mining expedition led to another provincial reorganization that restored District Status, political crisis however within the province's administration and fears of the pre-federal Nigerian government then being administered from Lagos and managed by non-Northerners scuttled the mining efforts.

Post-colonial period
In 1967, the collapse of the Government of Northern Nigeria again ended the administrative independence of Sumaila, this was not to be restored until the Second Nigerian Republic when a Sumailan, Abubakar Rimi was elected Governor of Kano under the People's Redemption Party. In 1983, the collapse of the PRP government saw another momentary transference of administration to Wudil.

Subdivisions
Its subdivisions are

Gala
Gani
Garfa
Gediya
Kanawa
Magami
Masu
Rimi
Rumo
Sitti
Sumaila

Prominent Sumailans
Muhammadu Abubakar Rimi politician, first Executive Governor of Kano State in Nigerian Second Republic. 
Abdullahi Aliyu Sumaila Politician, first Permanent secretary from Sumaila, former Secretary to the Kano State Executive Council, Principal Secretary to the Governor and Bureaucrat.
Comr. Mikailu Bala Gala
Politician, former Vice president national association of Kano State Students NAKSS, Former Secretary General Sumaila local government students association SULSA, From Gala ward.

Prominent Clans
Jobawa

References

.

Local Government Areas in Kano State